Highway 147 (AR 147, Ark. 147, and Hwy. 147) is a  north–south state highway in Crittenden County, Arkansas, United States. The route runs from Highway 131 at Bruins north across Interstate 40/US Route 79 (I-40/US 70/US 79) to US 64 near West Memphis. A portion of the route make up the western routing of the Great River Road.

Route description
Highway 147 begins near Horseshoe Lake, Arkansas at the southern terminus of Highway 131. The route runs north to serve as the eastern terminus of Highway 38, with Highway 147 picking up the Great River Road designation northbound. Highway 147 has another junction with Highway 131 before curving due north along the Mississippi River. The highway serves as the eastern terminus for Highway 50 south of Anthonyville, Arkansas before meeting a different Highway 131 in Edmondson. Highway 147 has a junctions with US 70 and I-40/US 79, with the former being the southern frontage road for the latter. The road continues north to terminate at US 64 near the city limits of West Memphis.

Major intersections
Mile markers reset at concurrencies.

See also

References

147
Transportation in Crittenden County, Arkansas
147